I'm Alright is a 1985 album by Loudon Wainwright III. It was his third release on Rounder Records, recorded in London. It was produced by Richard Thompson, who also played electric lead guitar on several songs. The back cover features a photo of the two together, captioned 'Loud and Rich'.

The poignant "Screaming Issue", one of Wainwright's few collaborations – this time with Terre Roche of The Roches – was never compiled, nor has it appeared on a live album. It concerned his then infant daughter Lucy Wainwright Roche, who has since played and recorded with him.

This album continued Wainwright's reinvention of himself as an acoustic-based artist, and was the first of his Richard Thompson produced collaborations, which would peak critically the following year with More Love Songs.

Richard Thompson continued to tour with Wainwright, and Danny Thompson of Pentangle into the late 1990s. His most recent appearance on a LW3 album was 2003's So Damn Happy.

The album was nominated for the "Best Contemporary Folk Recording" Grammy.

Track listing
All tracks composed by Loudon Wainwright III; except where indicated
"One Man Guy"  – 4:16
"Lost Love"  – 3:22
"I'm Alright"  – 2:23
"Not John"  – 4:25
"Cardboard Boxes"  – 3:15
"Screaming Issue" (Wainwright III, Terre Roche) – 4:52
"How Old Are You?"  – 2:08
"Animal Song"  – 2:16
"Out Of this World"  – 3:17
"Daddy Take a Nap"  – 3:59
"Ready or Not (So Ripe)"  – 4:17
"Career Moves"  – 3:16

Personnel
Loudon Wainwright III – guitar, vocals
Paul Brady – vocals
Richard Thompson – guitar, mandolin
Tony Coe – clarinet
Henry Lowther – cornet
Christine Collister – vocals
Gerry Conway – drums
Chris Karan – percussion, Executive Producer
Greg Prestopino – vocals
Chris Pyne – trombone
Chaim Tannenbaum – Executive Producer
Danny Thompson – string bass
Ric Sanders – electric and octave violin
Technical
Doug Bennett - engineer
Alex Madjitey - cover photography

Release history
LP: Rounder 3096 (U.S.)
LP: Demon FIEND54 (UK)
CD: Rounder 3096

References

External links
Rounder Records, catalogue website for I'm Alright

Loudon Wainwright III albums
1985 albums
Rounder Records albums